Japanese football in 1985

Japan Soccer League

Division 1

Division 2

First stage

East

West

Second stage

Promotion Group

Relegation Group

East

West

7-12 Playoff

Japanese Regional Leagues

Emperor's Cup

Japan Soccer League Cup

National team

Results

Players statistics

External links

 
Seasons in Japanese football